Diane Tammes  (10 April 1942 in Welshpool – 30 May 2020) was a British filmmaker. In 1992, she won a Bafta award for Television Craft.

She graduated from National Film and Television School.

Filmography 

 Riddles of the Sphinx (1977)
 Some Women of Marrakesh (1977) 
Amy! (1980) 
 Crystal Gazing (1982)
 The Bad Sister (1983)
Casualties – Homerton Hospital (1992)

References 

1942 births
2020 deaths
British filmmakers